Elmer E. Halsey (January 1861 – March 12, 1943) was an American politician in the state of Washington. He served in the Washington House of Representatives and Washington State Senate.

References

Republican Party members of the Washington House of Representatives
1861 births
1943 deaths